Brandy Carr is a hamlet in the City of Wakefield in West Yorkshire, England, north of the eponymous Brandy Carr Hill and between Balne Beck in the west and Carr Gate Beck in the east. Brandy Carr was part of Kirkhamgate civil parish and is even now considered a part of Kirkhamgate as indicated by the road signage. The nearest settlements are Carr Gate in the north, Wrenthorpe in the southeast, and Kirkhamgate in the southwest. Rhubarb and liquorice are grown at Brandy Carr Nurseries, the latter since the reintroduction of its culture to Great Britain in the early 1990s by the business owner. There are no direct public transport links to Brandy Carr, the nearest bus stops are in Kirkhamgate ( west) for services to Wakefield, and at the junction of Brandy Carr Road with the A650 road ( east) for services to Bradford, Leeds, and Wakefield.

References

Hamlets in West Yorkshire
Geography of the City of Wakefield